The Asia/Oceania Zone was one of the three zones of the regional Davis Cup competition in 1997.

In the Asia/Oceania Zone there were four different tiers, called groups, in which teams competed against each other to advance to the upper tier. The top two teams in Group IV advanced to the Asia/Oceania Zone Group III in 1998. All other teams remained in Group IV.

Participating nations

Draw
 Venue: InterContinental Hotel, Muscat, Oman
 Date: 26–30 March

  and  promoted to Group III in 1998.

Results

Oman vs. Brunei

Jordan vs. Tajikistan

Syria vs. United Arab Emirates

Oman vs. Jordan

Brunei vs. United Arab Emirates

Syria vs. Tajikistan

Oman vs. Tajikistan

Brunei vs. Syria

Jordan vs. United Arab Emirates

Oman vs. Syria

Brunei vs. Jordan

Tajikistan vs. United Arab Emirates

Oman vs. United Arab Emirates

Brunei vs. Tajikistan

Jordan vs. Syria

References

External links
Davis Cup official website

Davis Cup Asia/Oceania Zone
Asia Oceania Zone Group IV